The ovarian plexus arises from the renal plexus, and is distributed to the ovary, and fundus of the uterus.

It is carried in the suspensory ligament of the ovary.

References

External links

Nerve plexus
Nerves of the torso